This is a list of performers who focus on maritime music or who have at some point made notable contributions to that genre.

Traditional-style performers
Jerry Bryant, singer-songwriter from Maine, also performs historical shanties in a traditional style.
David Coffin, from Gloucester, Massachusetts, leader of Revels music group in Cambridge. 
Johnny Collins, a modern-day shantyman (1938–2009)
Forebitter, group featuring performers associated with the Mystic Seaport Museum
Stan Hugill, "Last Working Shantyman" (1906–1992)
The Idlers, an all-male a cappella shanty group at the United States Coast Guard Academy (1957–present)
The Johnson Girls, an all-female shanty group from New York
Tom and Chris Kastle, singer-songwriters from Chicago, also perform historical shanties in a traditional style
Tom Lewis, Canadian singer-songwriter, also performs historical shanties in a traditional style
Northern Neck Shanty Singers, a menhaden shanty group, some of whom learned the songs as work songs on fishing boats when they were young men
Roberts and Barrand, proponents of traditional British song from New York and New England (1969-)
Salty Walt & the Rattlin' Ratlines, from San Francisco

Folk music-style performers
Peter Bellamy, British folk singer; wrote "Roll Down" (aka "Transports Shanty") (1944-1981)
Debra Cowan, sea music performer from Shrewsbury, Massachusetts
Roger McGuinn, from Chicago
William Pint and Felicia Dale, from Seattle
Bob Roberts, British Merchant Seaman and folk singer (1907–1982)
Stan Rogers, Canadian performer; wrote "Barrett's Privateers" (1949–1983)
Cyril Tawney, British performer (1930–2005)
John Townley, also known for opening the first 12-track recording studio in New York, Apostolic Recording Studio
Bob Zentz
Stompin' Tom Connors
Alan Mills, Canadian performer, folk singer, writer and actor, best known for multiple recording on Folkways Records including "Songs of the Sea" recorded in 1959 (1913-1977)

Contemporary-style performers
Banana Boat, an a cappella sextet from Poland performing "neo-shanties" as well as traditional sea-shanties in contemporary arrangements
Bounding Main, an a cappella quintet based near Kenosha, Wisconsin
Captain Bogg and Salty, a pirate-themed rock band which performs many traditional shanties, as well as writing several of their own
Great Big Sea, Canadian band performing some shanties in traditional style

See also
Sea in culture#In music
Sea shanty
Folk music
List of maritime music festivals

References

Maritime music performers
Maritime music